Saiwai Station (幸駅, Saiwai-eki) is a train station located in Saiwai-machi, Isahaya, Nagasaki Prefecture. The station is serviced by Shimabara Railway and is a part of the Shimabara Railway Line.

Lines 
The train station is serving for the Shimabara Railway Line with the local trains and some express train stop at the station.

Adjacent stations

See also 
 List of railway stations in Japan

External links 
 

Railway stations in Japan opened in 2000
Railway stations in Nagasaki Prefecture
Stations of Shimabara Railway